Black Hills is a 1947 American Western film directed by Ray Taylor and starring Eddie Dean, Shirley Patterson, and Roscoe Ates. It was shot at the Iverson Ranch. It was part of a series of fifteen B westerns produced by PRC featuring Dean and Ates.

Plot

Cast
 Eddie Dean as Eddie Dean 
 Roscoe Ates as Soapy Jones 
 Shirley Patterson as Janet Hadley 
 Terry Frost as Dan Kirby 
 Steve Drake as Larry Hadley 
 Nina Bara as Chiquita 
 William Fawcett as Clerk Tuttle 
 Lane Bradford as Henchman Al Cooper 
 Lee Morgan as Sheriff 
 George Chesebro as Land Agent Henry Allen 
 Slim Whitaker as Pete - Gambler

References

Bibliography
 Drew, Bernard A. Motion Picture Series and Sequels: A Reference Guide. Routledge, 2013.
 Hanson, Patricia King & Dunkleberger, Amy. Afi: American Film Institute Catalog of Motion Pictures Produced in the United States : Feature Films 1941-1950. University of California Press, 1999.

External links

1947 films
American Western (genre) films
American black-and-white films
1947 Western (genre) films
Films directed by Ray Taylor
Eagle-Lion Films films
Producers Releasing Corporation films
Films with screenplays by Joseph F. Poland
1940s English-language films
1940s American films